Joseph Dalton "Nakina" Smith (July 26, 1913 – March 19, 1982) was a Canadian ice hockey player. He was born in Cache Bay, Ontario, but grew up in Nakina, Ontario.

Smith played hockey between 1933 and 1950, including ten games in the National Hockey League with the Detroit Red Wings during the 1943–44 season.

Career statistics

Regular season and playoffs

External links
 

1913 births
1982 deaths
Canadian ice hockey centres
Dallas Texans (USHL) players
Detroit Red Wings players
Ice hockey people from Ontario
Indianapolis Capitals players
London Tecumsehs players
Los Angeles Monarchs players
Minneapolis Millers (AHA) players
New Haven Eagles players
Northern Ontario Hockey Association players
Ontario Hockey Association Senior A League (1890–1979) players
People from Thunder Bay District
Philadelphia Falcons players
Rochester Cardinals players
St. Louis Flyers (AHA) players
St. Louis Flyers players
St. Paul Saints (USHL) players
Canadian expatriate ice hockey players in the United States